Riemann manifold may refer to:

Riemann surface in complex analysis
Riemannian manifold in Riemannian geometry
Zariski–Riemann space consisting of valuations